Literacy in the United States was categorized by the National Center for Education Statistics into different literacy levels, with 92% of American adults having at least "Level 1" literacy in 2019.  According to the U.S. Department of Education, 54% of adults in the United States have prose literacy below the 6th-grade level.

In many nations, the ability to read a simple sentence suffices as literacy, and was the previous standard for the U.S. The definition of literacy has changed greatly; the term is presently defined as the ability to use printed and written information to function in society, to achieve one's goals, and to develop one's knowledge and potential.

The United States Department of Education assesses literacy in the general population through its National Assessment of Adult Literacy (NAAL). The NAAL survey defines three types of literacy:
 Prose: the knowledge and skills needed to search, comprehend, and use continuous texts. Examples include editorials, news stories, brochures, and instructional materials.
 Document: the knowledge and skills needed to search, comprehend, and use non-continuous texts in various formats. Examples include job applications, payroll forms, transportation schedules, maps, tables, and drug and food labels.
 Quantitative: the knowledge and skills required to identify and perform computations, either alone or sequentially, using numbers embedded in printed materials. Examples include balancing a checkbook, figuring out tips, completing an order form, or determining an amount.
Modern jobs often demand a high literacy level, and its lack in adults and adolescents has been studied extensively.

According to a 1992 survey, about 40 million adults had Level 1 literary competency, the lowest level, comprising understanding only basic written instructions. A number of reports and studies are published annually to monitor the nation's status, and initiatives to improve literacy rates are funded by government and external sources.

History
In early U.S. colonial history, teaching children to read was the responsibility of the parents for the purpose of reading the Bible. The Massachusetts law of 1642 and the Connecticut law of 1650 required that not only children but also servants and apprentices were required to learn to read. During the industrial revolution, many nursery schools, preschools and kindergartens were established to formalize education. The majority of youth in southern states were not able to receive secondary schooling until the 1920s. Throughout the 20th century, there was an increase in federal acts and models to ensure that children were developing their literacy skills and receiving education. Starting in the 2000s, there has been an increase of immigrants in cities, the majority of whose children speak languages other than English and who thus fall behind their peers in reading. Elementary school literacy has been the focus of educational reform since that time.

The National Bureau of Economic Research published a data set with an overview of the history of education in the United States until the 20th and 21st centuries. According to the bureau, "Formal education, especially basic literacy, is essential for a well-functioning democracy, and enhances citizenship and community."

19th century literacy rates in the United States were relatively high, despite the country's decentralized educational system. By 1875, the U.S. literacy rate was approximately 80 percent. There has been a notable increase in American citizens' educational attainment since then, but studies have also indicated a decline in reading performance which began during the 1970s. Although the U.S. Adult Education and Literacy System (AELS) and legislation such as the Economic Opportunity Act of 1964 had highlighted education as an issue of national importance, the push for high levels of mass literacy has been a recent development; expectations of literacy have sharply increased over past decades. Contemporary literacy standards have become more difficult to meet than historical criteria, which were applied only to the elite. Due to the proliferation (and increased accessibility) of public education, the expectation of mass literacy has been applied to the entire U.S. population.

Literacy has particular importance in adulthood since the changing dynamics of the American job market demand greater skills and knowledge of entry-level workers. In the 2003 National Assessment of Adult Literacy, young adults without a post-secondary education experienced difficulty obtaining career positions. A multi-variable analysis indicated that low and below-basic literacy rates were characteristic of individuals without higher education, and improving and sustaining mass literacy at earlier stages of education has become a focus of American leaders and policymakers.

With the landmark publication of A Nation at Risk  by the US National Commission on Excellence in Education. in 1983, concern for the performance of American students relative to other student bodies worldwide intensified. It has been observed that adolescents undergo a critical transition during their grade-school years which prepares them to learn and apply knowledge to their actions and behavior in the outside world. As the job market has become more demanding, the rigor of educational institutions has increased to prepare students for the more-complex tasks which will be expected of them. Addressing sub-par reading performance and low youth literacy rates are important to achieve high levels of mass literacy because the issue of sub-par academic performance is compounded. Students who struggle at an early age continue to struggle throughout their school years because they do not have the same foundation of understanding and breadth of knowledge to build upon as their peers; this often translates to below-average, poor literacy levels in later grades and into adulthood.

Adult and adolescent literacy levels are under greater scrutiny in the U.S., with a number of reports and studies published annually to monitor the nation's status. Initiatives to improve literacy rates have taken the form of government provisions and external funding, which have been driving forces behind national education reform from primary school to higher education.

In 2019, the National Center for Educational Statistics reported that 4.1% of US adults had literacy abilities below level 1, defined as "unable to successfully determine the meaning of sentences, read relatively short texts to locate a single piece of information, or complete simple forms", and could be classified as functionally illiterate.

The COVID-19 pandemic necessitated school closures which had a negative impact on child literacy in America. More than one million eligible children did not enroll in kindergarten for the 2021-2022 school year in the U.S.

Defining adult literacy
The simplest definition of literacy in a nation is the percent of people age 15 or older who can read and write, which is used to rank nations. More-complex definitions, involving the kind of reading needed for occupations or tasks in daily life, are termed functional literacy, prose literacy, document literacy and quantitative literacy. These more-complex definitions of literacy are useful to educators, and are used by the Department of Education.

In a 2003 study of adults, the National Center for Education Statistics (part of the Education Department) measured functional literacy. The center measured three types of functional literacy: prose literacy, document literacy, and quantitative literacy. Prose literacy consists of the "knowledge and skills needed to perform prose tasks", and includes the ability to read news articles and brochures. Document literacy consists of the "knowledge and skills needed to perform document tasks", which include job applications, payroll forms and maps. Similarly, quantitative literacy is the "knowledge and skills required to perform quantitative tasks"; those tasks include balancing a checkbook and filling out an order form.

The governments of other countries may label individuals who can read a few thousand simple words which they learned by sight in the first four grades in school as literate. UNESCO has collected the definitions used by nations in their tables of literacy in its General Metadata on National Literacy Data table; variations depend on whether childhood literacy (age six) or adult literacy was measured. The list distinguishes between a respondent's self-reported literacy and demonstrated ability to read.

Other sources may term individuals functionally illiterate if they are unable to read basic sources of written information, such as warning labels and driving directions. According to The World Factbook from the U.S. Central Intelligence Agency (CIA), "There are no universal definitions and standards of literacy" and its statistics are based on the most common definition: "the ability to read and write at a specified age." The National Center for Education Statistics defines literacy as "the ability to understand, evaluate, use and engage with written texts to participate in society, to achieve one's goals, and to develop one's knowledge and potential." "Detailing the standards that individual countries use to assess the ability to read and write is beyond the scope of the Factbook. Information on literacy, while not a perfect measure of educational results, is probably the most easily available and valid for international comparisons." The World Factbook does not include the U.S. literacy rate in its reporting. Using its definition, literacy refers to the percentage of people age 15 or older who can read and write.

Failure to complete secondary school is blamed for some problems with literacy, and programs directly addressing literacy have increased.

Measuring adult literacy 
Functional literacy can be divided into useful literacy, informational literacy and pleasurable literacy. Useful literacy reflects the most-common practice of using an understanding of written text to navigate daily life. Informational literacy can be defined as text comprehension and the ability to connect new information presented in the text to previous knowledge. Pleasurable literacy is the ability of an individual to read, understand, and engage with texts that he or she enjoys. In a more abstract sense, multiple literacy can be classified into school, community, and personal concepts. These categories refer to an individual's ability to learn about academic subjects, understand social and cultural contexts, and learn about themselves from an examination of their own backgrounds.

In 1988, the Department of Education was asked by Congress to undertake a national literacy survey of American adults. The study identifies a class of adults who, although not meeting the criteria for functional illiteracy, face reduced job opportunities and life prospects due to inadequate literacy levels relative to requirements which were released in April 2002 and reapplied in 2003 as trend data. The 2002 study involved lengthy interviews with adults who were statistically balanced for age, gender, ethnicity, education level, and location (urban, suburban, or rural) in 12 states across the country, and was designed to represent the U.S. population as a whole. The National Adult Literacy Survey, conducted in 1992, was the first literacy survey which provided "accurate and detailed information on the skills of the adult population as a whole." The U.S. has participated in cyclical, large-scale assessment programs undertaken by the National Assessment of Adult Literacy (NAAL) and sponsored by the National Center for Education Statistics (NCES) since 1992. The survey revealed that the literacy of about 40 million adults was limited to Level 1 (the lowest level, an understanding of basic written instructions).

The Institute of Education Sciences conducted large-scale assessments of adult proficiency in 1992 and 2003 with a common methodology from which trends could be measured. The study measures prose, document and quantitative skills, and 19,000 subjects participated in the 2003 survey. There was no significant change in prose or document skills, and a slight increase in quantitative skills. As in 2008, roughly 15% of the sample could function at the highest levels of all three categories; about 50% were at basic or below-basic levels of proficiency in all three categories. The government study indicated that 21 to 23% of adult Americans were "not able to locate information in text", could "not make low-level inferences using printed materials", and were "unable to integrate easily identifiable pieces of information." About one-fourth of the individuals who performed at this level reported that they were born in another country, and some were recent immigrants with a limited command of English. 62% of the individuals on that level of the prose scale said they had not completed high school, and 35% had no more than eight years of education. A relatively high percentage of the respondents at this level were African American, Hispanic, or Asian/Pacific Islander, and about 33% were age 65 or older. 26% of the adults who performed at Level 1 said that they had a physical, mental or health condition which kept them from participating fully in work and other activities, and 19% reported vision problems which made reading print difficult. The individuals at this level of literacy had a diverse set of characteristics which influenced their performance; according to this study, 41% to 44% of U.S. adults at the lowest level of the literacy scale were living in poverty. A NAAL follow-up study by the same group of researchers, using a smaller database (19,714 interviewees), was released in 2006 which indicated some upward movement of low-end (basic and below to intermediate) in U.S. adult literacy levels and a decline in the full-proficiency group.

The United States was one of seven countries which participated in the 2003 Adult Literacy and Life Skills Survey (ALL), whose results were published in 2005. The U.S. and dozens of other countries began participating in the Program for the International Assessment of Adult Competencies (PIAAC), a large-scale assessment of adult skills—including literacy—under the auspices of the Organisation for Economic Co-operation and Development (OECD), in 2011. The NCES describes the PIACC as the "most current indicator of the nation's progress in adult skills in literacy, numeracy, and problem-solving in technology-rich environments."

Department of Education surveys

English Language Proficiency Survey (1982)
In 1982, funded by the United States Department of Education, the United States Census Bureau conducted the English Language Proficiency Survey (ELPS): an in-home literacy test of 3,400 adults. The Education Department considered this direct measure of literacy more accurate than a 1979 estimate which inferred literacy from the number of years of education completed. Data from the ELPS were presented in a 1986 Census Bureau report which concluded that 13% of adults living in the United States were illiterate in English. Nine percent of adults whose native language was English (native speakers) were illiterate, and 48 percent of non-native speakers were illiterate in English but not necessarily illiterate in their maternal language.

In his 1985 book, Illiterate America, Jonathan Kozol ascribed the very-high figures for literacy to weaknesses in methodology. Kozol noted that in addition to this weakness, the reliance on written forms would have excluded many individuals who did not have a literate family member to fill out the form for them. The Census Bureau reported a literacy rate of 86%, based on personal interviews and written responses to Census Bureau mailings. The bureau considered an individual literate if they said that they could read and write, and assumed that anyone with a fifth-grade education had at least an 80% chance of being literate. Kozol suggested that because illiterate people are likely to be unemployed and may not have a telephone or permanent address, the Census Bureau would have been unlikely to find them.

National Adult Literacy Survey (1992) 

In 1988, the Department of Education was asked by Congress to undertake a national literacy survey of American adults. The National Center for Education Statistics, part of the Department of Education, awarded a contract to the Educational Testing Service and a subcontract to Westat to design and conduct the survey.

The 1992 National Adult Literacy Survey (NALS) provided detailed information on the skills of the adult population as a whole. The survey interviewed about 26,000 people aged 16 and older: a nationally representative sample of about 14,000 people and an additional 12,000 surveys from states which opted into state-level assessments. Its results were published in 1993. That year, the NALS was described as a nationally representative, continuing assessment of the English-language literary skills of American adults. The study avoided a single standard of literacy, assessing individuals in three aspects of literacy with each aspect defined on a 500-point scale. Scores in each aspect (prose, document, and quantitative) were grouped in five levels: level 1 (0-225), level 2 (226-275), level 3 (276-325), level 4 (326-375), and level 5 (376-500).

National Assessment of Adult Literacy (2003) 
The National Assessment of Adult Literacy (NAAL) was sponsored by the National Center for Education Statistics (NCES) as one of its assessment programs. The study included comparisons to the 1992 survey. Adults over sixteen years of age were scored on their prose, document, and quantitative literacy. Although there was no significant change in prose and document literacy between 1992 and 2003, quantitative literacy improved. The study maintained the practice of the 1992 National Adult Literacy Survey of dividing literacy into three aspects, each measured on a 500-point scale. Scores in each aspect were again grouped into five different levels, using a new numerical scale which differed for each aspect.

Report on the Condition of Education (2022)
Mandated by Congress, the annual Condition of Education Report is conducted by the National Center for Education Statistics (NCES) assesses national education data using 88 indicators and includes workforce statistics and global comparisons. The  NCES operates under the aegis of the U.S. Department of Education as its statistical, with primary responsibility for the collection and analysis of education data.

International surveys

Adult Literacy and Life Skills Survey

The United States participated in the Adult Literacy and Life Skills Survey (ALL) with Bermuda, Canada, Italy, Norway, Switzerland, and the Mexican state of Nuevo León. Data was collected in 2003, and the results were published in 2005. Adults were scored on five levels of difficulty in prose, document and numeracy literacy. In 2003, only eight percent of the population aged 16 to 65 in Norway fell into the lowest skill level (level 1). The highest percentage was 47%, in Italy; the United States was third-highest at 20%.

Program for the International Assessment of Adult Competencies 

The United States participated in the Programme for the International Assessment of Adult Competencies (PIAAC), which was "developed under the auspices" of the OECD. The PIACC is a "collaborative endeavour involving the participating countries, the OECD Secretariat, the European Commission and an international consortium led by Educational Testing Service (ETS)". According to the National Center for Education Statistics (NCES), the PIACC provides the "most current indicator of the nation's progress in adult skills in literacy, numeracy, and problem-solving in technology-rich environments" and is a "large-scale assessment of adult skills."

In 2012, 24 countries participated in the large-scale study; thirty-three countries participated in 2014.
The 2013 OECD report "First Results from the Survey of Adult Skills", which published the results of tests conducted in 2011 and 2012, said that the "skills of adults in the United States [had] remained relatively unchanged in the decade since the previous report, while other countries have been showing improvements, especially among adults with low basic skills." The 2011 literacy test for was altered: "Before the PIAAC 2011 survey, however, essentially all that one could infer about the literacy skills of adults below Level 1 was that they could not consistently perform accurately on the easiest literacy tasks on the survey. One could not estimate what literacy tasks they could do successfully, if any."

In 2016, PIAAC 2012 and 2014 data were released. Participating adults in Singapore and the United States had the largest number of adults scoring "at or below Level 1 in literacy proficiency" compared to other participating countries in their performance in "all three reading components". According to the authors of the OECD report, "These results may be related to the language background of the immigrant population in the United States."

According to the 2012-2014 data, 79% of U.S. adults (or 43.0 million people) have "English literacy skills sufficient to complete tasks that require comparing and contrasting information, paraphrasing, or making low-level inferences." In this study, immigrants are over-represented in the low English literacy population. Adults born outside the U.S. make up 34% of adults with low literacy skills while making up only 15% of the population. However, of the adults with low English literacy skills, 66% were born in the U.S.

Gallup impact study of PIAAC 
Gallup principal economist Jonathan Rothwell concluded, in a 2020 analysis and economic impact study of the PIAAC results collected during 2012 - 2017; commissioned by the Barbara Bush Foundation for Family Literacy, that the United States could increase its annual GDP by 10%, adding $2.2 trillion in annual income, by enabling greater literacy for the 54% of Americans reading below a sixth-grade level nationwide. The analysis noted that, of the 33 OECD nations included in the survey, the U.S. had placed sixteenth for literacy, and surmised that about half of Americans surveyed, aged 16 to 74, had demonstrated a below sixth-grade reading level.

Central Connecticut State University study

From 2005 to 2009, Jack Miller of Central Connecticut State University conducted annual studies aimed at identifying America's most literate cities. Miller drew from a number of available data resources, and the CCSU America's Most Literate Cities study ranks the largest cities (population 250,000 and above) in the United States. The study focuses on six indicators of literacy: newspaper circulation, number of bookstores, library resources, periodical-publishing resources, educational attainment, and Internet resources.

Elementary school literacy 
School curriculum and literacy standards are defined grade-wise, for all students.

History of inequity 

The 1960s was a time when most African-American, Latino, and Native American students were primarily educated in different and segregated schools that were also "funded at rates many times lower than those serving white" students. Asian Americans also were subject to unjust and inhumane literacy education practice: "Early arguments for Asian American education hinged on the assumption that Asian Americans were inherently different—namely, depraved and disloyal—and consequently needed an education that would deter them from criminal delinquency." Rhetoric scholar Haivan Hoang asserts that unequal literacy practices persist today and that modern perceptions of the American literate individual is normalized in non-racial minority identities.

The U.S. public education has been "highly decentralized" compared to other nations, such as France. A decentralized public education system may result in coordination problems among staff and faculty, an expectation to carry out a "large group of staff specialists at enormous cost," and there is no standardization of education at a national scale. Various studies from the early 2000s and later reveal that the U.S. was ranked number 20 out of the 34 countries in the Organisation for Economic Co-operation and Development (OECD) in terms of earning average or below-average grades in reading, science, and mathematics. A news report stated that out of the total number of elementary school students that reached middle school grade in the United States, only 44% of them were proficient in reading and math by the year 2015. Compared to their white counterparts at the age of 5, black and Hispanic children score lower in expressive vocabulary, listening comprehension, and other acuity indicators.

In the 1900s, Black families began to spread across the United States to escape the brutality of the Jim Crow South. Segregation had rooted itself in U.S. society, including in American schools. The majority of southern youth of color were not able to receive secondary schooling until the 1920s.  Brown v. Board of Education of 1954 ruled the concept of “separate but equal” unconstitutional, beginning the desegregation of schools. Even so, the effects of segregation are still visible today, as many K-12 schools are in areas that are predominately home to BIPOC (Black Indigenous People of Color). These schools typically tend to be underfunded and lacking the resources to give their students the education they deserve. This historical injustice relates directly to why a majority of the elementary schools with struggling readers are in low income and/or minority areas today.

Some studies show that socioeconomically disadvantaged students, including those with subsidized lunches, score low reading levels. In addition, English language learners (ELL) and children of immigrants have high dropout rates and low scores on standardized tests. School districts provide the same materials for every student in the same grade levels, but each student learns at a different reading level and often is not able to engage with the text. Without distinguishing curriculum and standards, English language learners and children from low-income families fall behind their peers. Teachers spend a majority of their class time reading and supporting struggling readers, but teachers have not been able to do this all the time. Other than the educational risks of not working towards an equitable education, the ever-changing "economic and demographic landscapes" also demanded that there be a need for a "more robust policy [and] strategies" which would address the gaps in elementary education. Moreover, there was also an issue regarding the funding gap between the rich and poor schools. A report published during the Obama administration found that the funding gap grew to over 44% within ten years spanning from the early 2000s to 2012. Along with that, the Supreme Court's decision in San Antonio School District V. Rodriquez ruled that education is "not within the limited category of the rights recognized by the Constitution" and thus not protected by the Constitution.

Historical injustice and segregation in the United States has meant that most high poverty schools are composed of a minority-majority of BIPOC students. It has also allowed parents of color to be ridiculed and blamed for the failings of the school systems and of the government to teach children to read and write. One scholar comments on the city of Oakland's struggle with illiteracy: “Low levels of parental and community participation in public schools is frequently interpreted as an indication of disinterest in education. Yet there is no evidence to support such an assumption.”

Inequity was again demonstrated by the impact of the COVID-19 pandemic on education, with school closures negating traditional early learning systems nationwide. More than one million eligible children did not enroll in kindergarten for the 2020-2021 school year in the U.S.

The pandemic illustrated persistent racial and economic disparities, even "creating the potential for a lost generation."   Most affected are students in vulnerable communities, most notably BIPOC   children who were already experiencing unequal standards—from resources, like books to counselors to student-teacher ratios and extracurricular activities. Published in January 2022, Yale economist Fabrizio Zilibotti co-authored a study with professors from the University of Pennsylvania, Northwestern University and the University of Amsterdam, showing that "the pandemic is widening educational inequality and that the learning gaps created by the crisis will persist."

Solutions to elementary literacy gap in the United States

Solutions by the United States Government 

Federal government responses to address the problems of struggling English language learners and overstretched teachers ensued from the 1960s. Head Start was created in 1964 for children and families living under the poverty line, to help prepare children under five for elementary school and to provide family support for health, nutrition, and social services. In 1965, President Lyndon B. Johnson passed the Elementary and Secondary Education Act to ensure that each child gets equal education, regardless of their race or familial affluence. In response to English language learners, in 1968 Congress passed the Bilingual Education Act. The act allowed ELL students to learn in their first language and provided resources to assist schools with ELL students. Even as new legislation has come about throughout history that grants rights to BIPOC citizens, they are already behind because of the history of white supremacy  . Generational discrimination connects directly to why students who struggle in reading proficiency who attend underfunded schools are typically children of color. Statistically, schools with BIPOC enrollment of 90% or more in its student body spend $733 less per student per year than schools with a White student body of 90% or more enrolled. This statistic displays the disproportionate lack of funding for students of color in general and the same trend is seen in elementary school of the United States specifically.

Teachers play an extremely important role in the classroom given that they work with the student consistently enough to notice which students struggle most. Studies have shown that teacher judgment assessments are a really accurate determinant for elementary school students’ reading proficiency. They are not as precise as the curriculum based measurements (CBM) but extremely accurate on average. This gives faster and more personal results in terms of identifying which student needs more assistance. In 1997, President Bill Clinton proposed that tutors work with children reading below their grade level. Tutoring programs include partnerships with university organizations in which college students tutor and develop the literacy skills of elementary school students. Using non-certified teachers reduces the amount of money that a school would have to put into hiring many certified teachers, which increases the number of children that can be helped. Many underprivileged elementary school students need this reading proficiency assistance but also deserve the best quality given the historical inequities within the educational system. The tutoring model's components can ensure that service from a non-certified tutor can in fact prove to be effective by “engaging reading materials that are carefully graded in difficulty"; offering "a sequenced word study or phonics curriculum"; "regularly scheduled tutoring sessions (at least two each week)"; "a committed group of non certified tutors (para-professionals or community volunteers)": and "a knowledgeable reading teacher who provides ongoing supervision to the tutors.” Tutoring elementary school students is extremely effective when it is accompanied by a series of approved curriculum, adequate training, and systems of accountability.

By January 12, 2015, civil rights groups and education advocates drafted and released a document called the 'shared civil rights principles for the reauthorization of the Elementary and Secondary Education Act (ESEA),' which pushed for the reauthorization of a bill termed ESEA, which was initially drafted in 2002. Though not yet passed, the bill had innumerable pathways that insured money for the education sector. Still, due to the Senate and the House's polarization, it had not been re-approved and had been pending approval since 2007. The bill would push for equal access to educational opportunities for students across the country. "As of January 16, 22 organizations [had] signed the principles". The following day, on January 17, "Sen. Lamar Alexander, R. Tenn., released a draft reauthorization bill for ESEA".

Following ESEA approval, Charter I, also called Title I schools, according to the National Center for Education Statistics (NCES), received $6.4 billion in "Basic Grants," $1.3 billion in "Concentrated Grants," and $3.3 billion in "Targeted Grants" in 2015, in response to Elementary and Secondary Education Act (ESEA) being passed. ESEA ensures financial assistance is provided to local educational agencies who work for children coming from low-income families in pursuit of help, and hence fulfill the goals of state academic standards. These Title I schools can contract private nonprofit tutoring programs to work with their students in enhancing skills such as reading comprehension, analytical skills, and word recognition.

The provisions through the "No Child Left Behind Act adopted" in 2002, the reauthorization of the ESEA in 2015, and the "Every Student Succeeds Act (ESSA) in 2015" build upon specific guidelines, conditions, and financial policies, indicating progress towards equity in education. According to a study conducted in the state of Alabama, the "addition of [certain education] standards and a means of measuring whether a district has met those educational standards have heightened the awareness of a need for adequacy".

The American Rescue Plan Act of 2021 provided $122 billion in school funding for programs to assist with reopening amidst COVID-19 pandemic safety protocols and to address both academic and mental health needs of students. In July 2022, First Lady Jill Biden, a former teacher, and Education Secretary Miguel Cardona embarked on a two-day assessment tour to observe summer learning programs designed to help children catch up on reading, writing and arithmetic skills prior to the 2022-2023 school year.

Solutions by non-profit tutoring programs 

Non-governmental organizations have been described as the "missing link between the government and the poor": NGOs bridge the gap that the government leaves open for the less fortunate. While Non-governmental Organizations (NGOs) in education were also not prevalent during the early 2000s, but with the declining standards of education, NGOs, which included both non-profits and for-profits emerged, which focused more on the "private engagement", the one-on-one teaching mode. "Private engagement [by tutoring programs] is not only altering the delivery of education but also participating in the reshaping of the politics of education" since the usage of material and mode of instruction does help mold the way a student views the world. Also, since the 1990s, and up until the early 21st century, there was a more significant concern regarding "the need for better articulation and specification of concepts," which were challenges that NGOs had to address. Though the work of NGOs in any field is to an extent independent of government intervention, however, there is some overlap and collaboration between them. NGOs within the education and literacy sectors are seen as supplemental to the already large governmental role in education. NGOs strengthen the overall reach that society can have on a child's education.

Reading Partners 

Reading Partners' history dates back to 1999 when three community leaders from Menlo Park in California launched a one-on-one tutoring program to help these children facing the aforementioned problems at Belle Haven Community School. Reading Partners was founded on enhancing reading and comprehension skills which would produce literate global citizens. "Before the 1990s, contracting for services in K-12 education tended to focus on what has been called non-instructional services".

Over time, the program acquired a nonprofit organization's status, garnered support from local and state leaders, and gained financial and social assistance from foundations like AmeriCorps, George Kaiser Family Rainwater Charitable Foundation, and the Edna McConnell Clark Foundation. Reading Partners has now spread to several states across the U.S. and is headquartered in Oakland, California. "While supporting nonprofits, these foundations are engaged in what Janelle Scott and others refer to as venture philanthropy". The organization has a hierarchical system with a board of directors on top. Each board member oversees a specific branch of the organization, such as the logistical branch, support branch, PR branch, and a branch focused on crafting an educational curriculum.

The organization currently works only with Charter I schools, low-income public elementary schools which are independently operated. The reason behind such a directed target is what Reading Partner calls the reduction in students "experiencing poverty [who] face immense educational barriers and enter elementary school already further behind their peers who are not experiencing poverty".

Reading Partners, among other Non-profit organizations, in collaboration with other academic and government institutions, crafted a curriculum aligned with the Common Core State Standards (CCSS), which have been implemented by most states. This ensures that the tutees' instruction would be synonymous with other students in all other schools. Pre-and Post-reading questions were added to initiate critical thinking from the students in every lesson. There was increased use of colored books to catch attention and enlarged fonts to prevent the tutee's reading difficulty. Mid-semester tests, called STAR assessments, were designed and employed, which allowed reinforcement of vocabulary and concepts during preceding lessons, since "students learn complex information most effectively if they are allowed to experience the information in various formats". Reading Partners' approach to improving the reading skills of students is grounded within the research on "literacy interventions in general and one-to-one tutoring specifically". Also, the use of "two-or three-dimensional graphics, color illustrations, audio, and video sequences, and even two-or three-dimensional animation and simulations" by Reading Partners, proved to be "an invaluable pedagogical advance".

Many research models have been employed to test the efficacy of instructional models, including Reading Partners' crafted schemes. The organization focuses on word recognition in the lessons and repetition of lessons prepared to test and enhance the tutees' visuospatial and phonological interpreting skills. One research focused on the comparison of various approaches to additional reading instruction for low-achieving second-grade students. The study found out that "approaches that combined word recognition and reading comprehension treatment increased phonological decoding significantly more than the treated control or word recognition only treatment and had the highest effect size". In another study, the treated children receiving additional instruction were seen to improve significantly more in the areas of phonological decoding and reading real words than did those in another program, and the "combined word recognition and reading comprehension treatment, which was explicit, had the highest effect sizes for both pseudoword and real-word reading." It was recognized from the study that the most effective supplemental instruction to increase phonological decoding was the combination of explicit word recognition and detailed reading comprehension training. Also, according to a 2017 study, for the average Reading Partners student, after attendance of one year in Reading Partner's tutoring program, there was an "improvement [that] was equivalent to moving from the 15th percentile to the 21st percentile".

The role of tutors is of great importance in Reading Partners, though the utilization of tutors effectively is incumbent on their training, and education level. The minimum requirement for being chosen as a volunteer tutor is based on completing secondary school in the U.S. The tutors are required to attend training and shadow one or more sessions with another experienced tutor or staff member to accumulate the logistical and academic rigor at least two times a week, with each session being a 45-minute session. One tutor is assigned with one student for a whole school year, and tutors follow a pre-designed and pre-approved curriculum. The excellent use of visual aids, including stills and colorful drawings, and the deployment of alluring graphics in each tutoring session for the tutee have been very beneficial for the students. The testable approaches employed, such as pre-and post-lecture questions focusing on the lecture's main ideas, to better the tutee's reading, comprehension, and analytical skills, resulted in fruitful gains. A study found that such tutoring interventions "have a significant positive effect on participating students' verbal skills" as well. Tutors have, over the years, been showing increasing interest in giving back to the community and making a mark in society by watering the seeds of today, the students, that will sprout into a tree tomorrow, literate citizens. As Bethany Grove puts it in her research study, "tutors who volunteer with Reading Partners are there to make a difference for students, just as volunteers with other organizations are seeking to make an impact". In terms of reducing the achievement that is present in the United States, specifically for elementary students, "research on volunteer tutoring found that despite many limitations," the programs which employ one-on-one tutoring pedagogy "can be effective in improving student achievement".

NAEP

In the United States, the National Assessment of Educational Progress or NAEP ("The Nation's Report Card") is the national assessment of what students know and can do in various subjects. Four of these subjects—reading, writing, mathematics and science—are assessed most frequently and reported at the state and district level, usually for grades 4 and 8.

In 2019, with respect to the reading skills of the nation's grade-four public school students, 34% performed at or above the Proficient level (solid academic performance) and 65% performed at or above the Basic level (partial mastery of the proficient level skills). The results by race / ethnicity were as follows:

NAEP reading assessment results are reported as average scores on a 0–500 scale. The Basic Level is 208 and the Proficient Level is 238. The average reading score for grade-four public school students was 219. Female students had an average score that was 7 points higher than male students. Students who were eligible for the National School Lunch Program (NSLP) had an average score that was 28 points lower than that for students who were not eligible.

Reading scores for the individual states and districts are available on the NAEP site. Between 2017 and 2019 Mississippi was the only state that had a grade-four reading score increase and 17 states had a score decrease.

English-language learners and literacy

Literacy standards and tests also apply to non-English speaking populations in schools. Implemented in 2010, Common Core serves as the national education curriculum and standards by which most public schools must abide. It serves as the latest vision of literacy in America, including comprehension skills in writing and reading and methods to achieve annual standards. Common Core's aim is to improve and expand literacy for students by the end of their high school careers. Within this system there are principals to address English language learners (ELL), and their placement within classrooms of native English speakers. This area of curriculum is designed to offer an extra layer of support for ELL. The US Department of Education and National Center for Education Statistics have found discrepancies within Common Core's curriculum that do not fully address the needs of ELL populations. Educational gaps are created by inequality within classrooms, in this case, a separation between ELL and native English speakers are due in part by Common Core's lack of support.

E.L.L. have remained "stuck" at an intermediate level of proficiency brought on by expectations and standardized testing that places them behind and distances them from their English-speaking peers. These expectations produce a cycle of needing to "catch up" or needing to be at the same level as other students without the extra accommodations. A study from 2011 concluded that 65% of Bay Area, eighth-grade E.L.L.s scored "Below Basic" on standardized writing assessments, with only 1% scoring at the "Proficient" level.

See also
 Books in the United States
 Learning to read

References

Further reading

External links
 National Assessment of Adult Literacy
 ProLiteracy

Literacy
Education in the United States